Convocation Center may refer to:
 Convocation Center (Eastern Michigan University), arena on the campus of Eastern Michigan University
 Convocation Center (Northern Illinois University), arena on the campus of Northern Illinois University
 Convocation Center (Ohio University), arena on the campus of Ohio University
 Convocation Center (University of Texas at San Antonio), arena on the campus of University of Texas at San Antonio
 James Madison University Convocation Center, arena on the campus of James Madison University
 Memorial Athletic and Convocation Center, arena on the campus of Kent State University
 Ted Constant Convocation Center, arena on the campus of Old Dominion University

Former names
 Athletic & Convocation Center, former name of the arena at Notre Dame University, now known as the Edmund P. Joyce Center
 CSU Convocation Center, former name of the arena at Cleveland State University, now known as the Wolstein Center
 UCF Convocation Center, former name of the arena at University of Central Florida, now known as Addition Financial Arena
 University of Miami Convocation Center, former name of the arena at the University of Miami, now known as the Watsco Center
 Youngstown Convocation Center, former name of the arena in Youngstown, Ohio, now known as the Covelli Centre
 Convocation Center, former name of the arena at Arkansas State University, now known as First National Bank Arena